is a railway station located in the town of Shōnai, Yamagata Prefecture, Japan, operated by the East Japan Railway Company (JR East).

Lines
Nishibukuro Station is served by the Uetsu Main Line, and is located 151.1 rail kilometers from the terminus of the line at Niitsu Station.

Station layout
The station has two opposed side platforms connected by a footbridge. The station is unattended.

Platforms

History
With the privatization of the JNR on April 1, 1987, the station came under the control of the East Japan Railway Company.

Surrounding area
Nishibukuro Post Office

See also
List of railway stations in Japan

External links

 JR East Station information 

Stations of East Japan Railway Company
Railway stations in Yamagata Prefecture
Uetsu Main Line
Railway stations in Japan opened in 1950
Shōnai, Yamagata